The Parity Committee for the Reconstruction of the Fourth International was an international regrouping of Trotskyists in 1981, claiming at the time to represent the majority of Trotskyists in the world. 

It was formed from three elements: The OCRFI (Organising Committee for the Reconstruction of the Fourth International) which was centred on the Pierre Lambert-led Internationalist Communist Organisation in France; the Bolshevik Faction, which came out of the reunified Fourth International or United Secretariat of the Fourth International (USec) and was centred on Nahuel Moreno; and the PST of Argentina, and the LTT (Lenin-Trotsky Tendency), which also came from the USec and was led by long-term Lambertist secret entryists in the USec, such as Daniel Gluckstein ("Seldjouk") and others who came from the Revolutionary Communist League or Ligue Communiste Revolutionaire (LCR), French USec affiliate. Some LTT leaders, such as John Strawson in the International Marxist Group (IMG) in Britain did not join the Parity Committee. 

The LTT later fused its forces with the Lambertists internationally and the Parity Committee was to see most of the Bolshevik Faction supporters leave it in a split between Lambert and Moreno. The remaining elements became the FI-ICR.

Trotskyist political internationals